"", also titled in English as "Lord in heaven, Thou art merciful", is the national anthem of Niue. It was adopted in 1974, when Niue became a self-governing state within the realm of New Zealand.

History 
During Niue's history as a territory of New Zealand, the national anthem of Niue was New Zealand's "God Defend New Zealand". "God Save the King" was also used and is still used as the royal anthem for the monarchy of New Zealand. "" was created before the 1970s. It is not known who wrote it, but it is known that it was prepared by Sioeli Fusikata. When it was written, it had become a popular song on Niue, but the opportunity rarely arose for people to perform it publicly. In the 1963 South Pacific Games, Niue used the Flag of New Zealand as the flag to represent them, in keeping with the rest of the colonies of the British Empire not using the Union Jack at the games. Niue also used "" as their anthem instead of "God Defend New Zealand", because the organisers had requested that "identifying tunes" be used to represent nations at the games instead of recognised national anthems. However, Niue failed to win any events, so "" was not performed at the games.

In 1974, the same year that Niue's new constitution granted Niue the status of free association with New Zealand upon the passage of the Niue Constitution Act 1974 in the Parliament of New Zealand, Niue adopted "" as their national anthem to supersede "God Defend New Zealand". "God Save the King" was retained as the royal anthem for when the monarch is present in Niue.

Lyrics

See also 
 List of national anthems

Notes

References 

Oceanian anthems
Niuean culture
New Zealand songs